Susquehannock High School is a mid-sized suburban public high school in Glen Rock, Pennsylvania. It is the sole high school operated by the Southern York County School District. In 2014, enrollment was reported as 946 pupils in 9th through 12th grades. Susquehannock High School employed 70 teachers.

Susquehannock High School students may choose to attend York County School of Technology for training in the construction and mechanical trades. The Lincoln Intermediate Unit IU12 provides the school with a wide variety of services like specialized education for disabled students and hearing, speech and visual disability services and professional development for staff and faculty.

Extracurriculars
The district offers a variety of clubs, activities and an extensive sports program.

Sports
The district funds:

Boys
Baseball - AA
Basketball - AAA
Cross country - AA
Football - AAA
Golf - AAA
Lacrosse - AAAA
Soccer - AA
Swimming and diving - AA
Tennis - AAA
Track and field - AAA
Volleyball - AA
Wrestling - AAA

Girls
Basketball - AAA
Cross country - AAA
Field hockey - AA
Lacrosse - AAAA
Soccer - AA
Softball - AAA
Swimming and diving - AA
Tennis - AAA
Track and field - AAA
Volleyball - AA

According to PIAA directory July 2014

Notable alumni
Ron Wolf (class of 1956), Former GM of the Green Bay Packers, inducted into the Pro Football Hall of Fame in 2015

Randy Edsall (class of 1976), Former college football coach for the University of Connecticut and University of Maryland
Ronnie McCoury (class of 1985), bluegrass musician
Rob McCoury (class of 1989), bluegrass musician
Summer Britcher (class of 2012), 3x Olympic Luger
Bailey Ryon (class of 2020), Broadway actress and Tony Honors winner

References

York County, Pennsylvania
Public high schools in Pennsylvania